Tomajan (also Romanized as Tomājān; also known as Tūmājān) is a village in Kojid Rural District, Rankuh District, Amlash County, Gilan Province, Iran. At the 2006 census, its population was 71, in 33 families.

References 

Populated places in Amlash County